The Brigade "Rey Alfonso XIII" II of the Legion (BRILEG) is a major tactical military formation of the Spanish Legion comprising two tercios with elements based in Viator (Almeria) and Ronda (Málaga)

History
The Brigade was created on August 11, 1995, occupying the facilities of the former XXIII Motorized Infantry Brigade. In 1996 the brigade was granted the denomination of "King Alfonso". The new Brigade was part of the Army's Rapid Action Forces, which in 2006 was renamed Light Force Command. It reorganized in 2015 into a Light Multi-Purpose Organic Brigade.

Structure
 Brigade "Rey Alfonso XIII" II of the Legion, in Viator
 Headquarters Bandera II of the Legion, in Viator
 Light Armored Cavalry Group of the Legion "Reyes Católicos" II, in Ronda (Centauro tank destroyers and VEC-M1 cavalry scout vehicles)
 Tercio "Juan de Austria" No. 3 of the Legion, in Viator
 Protected Infantry Bandera "Valenzuela" VII/3 (BMR-M1 armored personnel carriers)
 Protected Infantry Bandera "Colón" VIII/3 (BMR-M1 armored personnel carriers)
 Tercio "Alejandro Farnesio" No. 4 of the Legion, in Ronda
 Motorized Infantry Bandera "Millán Astray" X/4
 Field Artillery Group II of the Legion, in Viator (L-118A1 105mm towed howitzers)
 Engineer Bandera II of the Legion, in Viator
 Logistic Group II of the Legion, in Viator

References

Regiments of the Spanish Legion